This is a list of companies in the United States; by state where their headquarters is located:

Alabama

Alaska

Arizona

Arkansas

California

Colorado

Connecticut

Delaware

Florida

Georgia

Hawaii

 ABC Stores
 Alexander & Baldwin
 Aloha Petroleum
 American Savings Bank
 Aqua Hotels and Resorts
 Bank of Hawaii
 Blue Planet Software
 Central Pacific Bank
 Code Rebel
 First Hawaiian Bank
 Foodland Hawaii
 Hawaii National Bank
 Hawaiian Electric Industries
 Hawaiian Telcom
 Island Pacific Energy
 Kamakura Corporation
 Kauaʻi Island Utility Cooperative
 Matson, Inc.
 Maui Land & Pineapple Company
 Mauna Loa Macadamia Nut Corporation
 Mountain Apple Company
 Outrigger Hotels & Resorts
 Pacific LightNet
 Phase2 International
 Shirokiya
 Sullivan Family of Companies
 Times Supermarkets
 Tori Richard
 Visionary Related Entertainment

Idaho

Illinois

Indiana 

 1st Source
 Accuride
 AES Indiana
 Allison Transmission
 AM General
 Angie's List
 Anthem
 Applied Instruments
 Arni's Restaurant
 Atlas Van Lines
 Aurora Casket Company
 Batesville Casket Company
 Berry Plastics
 Better World Books
 Biomet
 BrightPoint
 Buehler Foods
 Calumet Lubricants
 Celadon Group
 Century Pharmaceuticals
 Chicago South Shore and South Bend Railroad
 CNO Financial Group
 Copient Technologies
 Cummins
 DePuy
 DirectBuy
 Do it Best
 Eli Lilly and Company
 Elwood Staffing
 Emmis Communications
 ExactTarget
 Finish Line, Inc.
 First Internet Bank of Indiana
 First Merchants Corporation
 The Ford Meter Box Company
 Golden Rule Insurance Company
 Guidant
 Gurney's Seed and Nursery Company
 Harlan
 Haynes International
 Herff Jones
 hhgregg
 Hill-Rom
 Hulman & Company
 Indiana Bell
 ITT Technical Institute
 JayC Food Stores, a division of Kroger
 Jayco, Inc
 Kimball International
 Klipsch Audio Technologies
 Marsh Supermarkets
 MCL Cafeterias
 Midcontinent Independent System Operator
 Monarch Beverage, Inc.
 NiSource
 Noble Roman's
 North American Van Lines
 Old National Bank
 Owen's Market, a division of Kroger
 Paige's Music
 Pay Less Super Markets, a division of Kroger
 Que Publishing
 Red Ball Corporation
 Republic Airways Holdings - Chautauqua Airlines (operating as American Connection), Republic Airlines, and Shuttle America
 Schurz Communications
 Scott's Food & Pharmacy, a division of Kroger
 Shindigz
 Shoe Carnival
 Simon Property Group
 Steak 'n Shake
 Steel Dynamics
 Sweetwater Sound
 Thor Industries
 Three Floyds Brewing
 Upland Brewing Company
 Vectren
 Vera Bradley
 Wabash National
 Weaver Popcorn Company
 Wheaton World Wide Moving
 Zimmer Holdings

Iowa

Agriprocessors
Casey's General Stores
Dubuque Bank and Trust
Fareway
Happy Joe's
Hartig Drug
HNI Corporation
Hy-Vee
iWireless
Kum & Go
Lee Enterprises
Maid-Rite
McLeodUSA
Meredith Corporation
MidAmerican Energy Company
Montgomery Ward
Musco Sport Lighting
Norby's Farm Fleet
Panchero's Mexican Grill
Pioneer Hi-Bred
Pizza Ranch
Principal Financial Group
Radio Dubuque
The Right Stuf International
Riverdeep
Rockwell Collins
Vermeer Company
Von Maur
West Liberty Foods
Winnebago Industries

Kansas

Kentucky

Louisiana

 APS Payroll
 CenturyTel
 Copeland's
 Entergy
 Freeport-McMoRan
 Hibernia National Bank
 Hornbeck Offshore Services
 Lamar Advertising Company
 McIlhenny Company
 Oreck Corporation
 Raising Cane's Chicken Fingers
 The Shaw Group
 Smoothie King
 Taylor Energy

Maine
Bushmaster Firearms International
Casco Bay Lines
Cole Haan
Energy East
Fairchild Semiconductor
Ground Round
L. L. Bean
Renys
TD Banknorth

Maryland

 Aggregate industries US
 Balducci's
 Black & Decker
 BlueHippo Funding
 BP Solar - USA
 Choice Hotels
 Constellation
 Coventry Health Care
 Discovery Communications
 GEICO
 Giant Food of Landover, Maryland
 GlobalStem
 Goodwill Industries
 Host Hotels & Resorts
 Jerry's Subs & Pizza
 JoS. A. Bank Clothiers
 Ledo Pizza
 Legg Mason
 Lockheed Martin
 Magruder's
 Marriott International
 Mars (supermarket)
 McCormick & Company
 MedImmune
 Mistral Group
 PRS Guitars
 Perdue Farms
 Piedmont Airlines
 Rent-A-Wreck
 Roy Rogers Family Restaurants
 Shoppers Food & Pharmacy, a division of SuperValu
 Stuckey's
 STX
 Super Fresh
 Sylvan Learning
 T. Rowe Price
 Telenor
 Transamerica
 Trophogen
 Under Armour
 United States Enrichment Corporation (USEC)
 Urban One
 W. R. Grace and Company
 Westat
 Xometry
 ZeniMax Media

Massachusetts

Michigan

Minnesota

Mississippi
 Ergon
 Mossy Oak
 Peavey Electronics
 Viking Range

Missouri

 Adam's Mark
 A. G. Edwards
 AMC Theatres
 Ameren
 Andy's Frozen Custard
 Anheuser-Busch
 Aquila, Inc.
 Arch Coal
 B&B Theatres
 Baron Aviation Services
 Bass Pro Shops
 Boeing Integrated Defense Systems
 Brown Shoe Company, owners of Famous Footwear
 Busch Entertainment Corporation
 Centene Corporation
 Cerner
 Charter Communications
 Columbia Insurance Group
 Commerce Bancshares
 Container Corporation of America
 Dierbergs
 Drury Hotels
 Edward Jones Investments
 Emerson Electric Company
 Energizer Holdings
 Enterprise Rent-A-Car
 Express Scripts Incorporated
 Farmland Industries
 Ferrellgas
 GoJet Airlines
 Graybar Electric Company
 Great Plains Energy
 Hallmark Cards
 Hardee's
 Helzberg Diamonds
 HOK Sport + Venue + Event
 H&R Block
 International Hat Company
 Interstate Bakeries Corporation
 Kansas City Life Insurance Company
 Kansas City Southern Industries
 Leggett & Platt
 Lifetouch
 McCabe-Powers Body Company
 MFA Oil
 Metropark Communications
 Missouri Employers Mutual Insurance
 Monsanto Company
 Olin Corp.
 O'Reilly Auto Parts
 Panera Bread
 Peabody Energy
 Premium Standard Farms
 Ralston Purina Company
 Rawlings Group
 Russell Stover Candies
 Save-A-Lot, a division of SuperValu
 Schnucks
 Shelter Insurance
 Shop 'n Save, a division of SuperValu
 Sigma-Aldrich
 Solutia Inc
 Suddenlink Communications
 Trans States Airlines, operated as United Express (defunct)
 UniGroup (Mayflower Transit and United Van Lines)
 Wehrenberg Theatres
 Winsteads

Montana
 Big Sky Airlines
 Big Sky Brewing Company
 Conlin's Furniture
 Corporate Air
 First Interstate BancSystem
 Kampgrounds of America (KOA)
 Merlin Airways
 RightNow Technologies
 Semitool
 Shiloh Rifle Manufacturing Company

Nebraska

 Affiliated Foods Midwest
 Berkshire Hathaway
 Buckle
 Cabela's
 ConAgra Foods
 Douglas Theatre Company
 First National of Nebraska
 Fort Western Stores
 Godfather's Pizza
 Gorat's
 Gordmans
 HobbyTown USA
 Intrado
 Kiewit Corporation
 Mister C's
 Mutual of Omaha
 Nelnet
 Omaha Star
 Omaha Steaks
 TD Ameritrade
 Union Pacific
 Werner Enterprises

Nevada

Allegiant Air
Bally Technologies
Boyd Gaming
Caesars Entertainment
Carroll Shelby International
Diamond Resorts
Las Vegas Sands
MGM Mirage
National University
Nevada Power Company
NV Energy
Port of Subs
Primaris Airlines - operations base
Red Rock Resorts
Scolari's Food and Drug
Scenic Airlines
Sierra Pacific Resources
Sierra Nevada Corporation
Skagen Designs
Southwest Gas Corporation
Terrible Herbst
Vici Properties
Wynn Resorts
Xtra Airways
Zappos.com

New Hampshire
 Boston-Maine Airways (Pan Am Clipper Connection)
 Brookstone
 C&S Wholesale Grocers
 DEKA
 Eastern Mountain Sports
 Hitachi Cable Manchester Inc.
 PC Connection
 State Line Tack
 Thompson Center Arms
 The Timberland Company
 Wiggins Airways

New Jersey

 American Standard Companies
 Automatic Data Processing
 Avaya
 Avis Budget Group
 Becton Dickinson
 Bed Bath & Beyond
 Benjamin Moore & Co.
 Bradco Supply
 Burlington Coat Factory
 Campbell Soup Company
 Catalent
 Ce De Candy, Inc.
 Celgene
 Century 21 Real Estate
 The Children's Place
 Chubb Corp.
 Church and Dwight
 Coach USA
 Commerce Bancorp
 Comodo Group
 Cooper Chemical Company
 Curtiss-Wright
 Cytec Industries
 DRS Technologies
 Emerson Radio
 Foodtown
 Foster Wheeler Corporation
 The Great Atlantic and Pacific Tea Company (Farmer Jack, Food Basics USA, The Food Emporium, Sav-A-Center, Super Fresh, Waldbaum's)
 Hartz Mountain Industries
 The Hertz Corporation
 Hovnanian Enterprises
 Hudson City Bancorp
 IDT Corp.
 Ingersoll Rand-Operational Headquarters
 Jackson Hewitt
 Jersey Mike's Subs
 Johnson & Johnson
 Liberty Travel
 Linens 'n Things
 Louis Berger Group
 Maidenform
 Medarex
 Medco Health Solutions
 Merck
 MTBC
 NRG Energy
 New England Motor Freight
 New Jersey Resources
 PNY Technologies
 Pathmark Stores
 Peterson's
 Pinnacle Foods
 Prince Sports
 Prudential Financial
 Public Service Electric and Gas Company
 R. R. Bowker
 Realogy
 Reckitt Benckiser North America
 RCI
 Schering-Plough
 Sealed Air
 Sixth Avenue Electronics
 Spencer's Gifts
 Toys "R" Us
 Unigene Laboratories
 Valley National Bank
 VoicePulse
 Vonage
 Wakefern Food Corporation/ShopRite (United States)-(Inserra Supermarkets)
 Weeks Marine
 Wyeth
 Wyndham Worldwide

New Mexico
 Blake's Lotaburger
 Deep Web Technologies
 Eclipse Aviation
 Laguna Development Corporation
 New Mexico Airlines
 PNM Resources
 Prediction Company
 Thornburg Mortgage

New York

North Carolina

 3C Institute
 ACN Inc.
 Advance Auto Parts
 Albemarle Corporation
 Alex Lee Inc.
 AM Racing
 American Spirit Media
 American Tire Distributors
 Atrium Health
 Bahakel Communications
 Bank of America 
 Bandwidth (company)
 Baen Books
 Belk
 Bernhardt Design
 The Biltmore Company
 Biltmore Farms
 BioCryst Pharmaceuticals
 Biscuitville 
 Bojangles' Famous Chicken 'n Biscuits
 BonWorth
 Boone Drug
 Brighthouse Financial
 Burt's Bees 
 Butterball
 Capitol Broadcasting Company
 CaptiveAire Systems
 Carlie C's
 Carolina Academic Press
 Carolina Beverage Corporation (maker of Cheerwine)
 Carolina Biological Supply Company
 Carolina Foods
 Carquest 
 Carr Amplifiers
 Cary Audio Design
 Cato Corporation
 Cedar Fair (executive offices)
 CenterEdge Software
 Champion 
 ChannelAdvisor
 Charles & Colvard
 Coastal Studios
 Coca-Cola Bottling Co. Consolidated
 Collins Aerospace
 Columbia Forest Products 
 CommScope
 Consonus
 Cook Out
 Crescent Communities
 Crowder Construction Company
 Curtis Media Group 
 Curtiss-Wright
 Deere-Hitachi Construction Machinery 
 Deltec Homes
 Dentsply Sirona
 D.H. Griffin Companies
 Dole plc (US headquarters)
 Duke Energy
 Earth Fare
 Enpro Industries
 Environmental Performance Vehicles
 Epic Games
 ESPNU
 Extended Stay America
 Family Dollar
 Firefly Balloons
 First Bancorp
 First Citizens BancShares
 Food Lion
 The Fresh Market 
 Front Row Motorsports
 Furnitureland South
 Fusion3
 Fuzzy Logix
 G1 Therapeutics
 Geoff Bodine Racing
 Ginn Racing
 Glen Raven, Inc.
 Golden Corral
 Graco (baby products)
 Graphik Dimensions, Ltd.
 Growler Manufacturing and Engineering
 Haas F1 Team
 Hanesbrands 
 Harris Teeter
 HDG International Group
 Hendrick Motorsports
 HomeTrust Bancshares
 Honda Aero
 Honda Aircraft Company
 Honeywell
 HSM (company)
 Hwy 55 Burgers Shakes & Fries
 The Iconfactory
 Ingersoll Rand
 Ingles 
 IntelliScanner Corporation
 ITG Brands
 Jaggaer
 Jeld-Wen
 Jennifer Jo Cobb Racing
 Jerry's Artarama
 Jimmy Means Racing
 Joe Gibbs Racing
 JR Motorsports
 JTG Daugherty Racing
 K&W Cafeterias
 Kayser-Roth 
 Kidde
 Kontoor Brands
 Koury Corporation
 Krispy Kreme 
 LabCorp 
 Lance Inc.
 LendingTree
 Lichty Guitars
 Liggett Group
 Limited Run Games
 Little Diversified Architectural Consulting
 Live Oak Bank
 Lenovo (operational headquarters)
 Locus Biosciences
 Lolly Wolly Doodle 
 Lord Corporation
 Lowe's 
 Lowes Foods 
 Ludwig Drums
 MAACO
 Mack Trucks 
 Martin Marietta Materials 
 McFarland & Company
 McKinney (advertising agency)
 Mechanics and Farmers Bank
 Meineke Car Care Centers
 Melon Bicycles
 Merge Records
 Microsoft (East Coast headquarters)
 Microtech Knives
 Moog Music
 MotorAve
 Mt. Olive Pickle Company
 Mountain Air Cargo
 Nantahala Outdoor Center
 NASCAR
 Nascent Republic Records
 National Gypsum
 Nautilus Productions
 nCino
 NEMCO Motorsports
 North Carolina Mutual Life Insurance Company
 Novant Health
 Nucor
 Odell Associates
 Old Dominion Freight Line
 Pamlico Capital
 The Pantry (Cary)
 Petty GMS Motorsports
 Piedmont Natural Gas
 Plant Delights Nursery
 Premier, Inc.
 PredictifyMe
 PrecisionHawk
 Progress Energy Inc 
 Purolator Filters 
 Putt-Putt Fun Center
 Qorvo
 Rack Room Shoes
 Redeye Distribution
 Red Hat 
 Red Oak Brewery
 Red Storm Entertainment
 Reeds Jewelers
 Replacements, Ltd.
 Reynolds American 
 RFK Racing
 Roses Stores 
 Rick Ware Racing
 Richard Childress Racing
 RSC Brands
 Saint Benedict Press
 Salsarita's Fresh Mexican Grill
 SAS Institute 
 Sealed Air
 Sealy Corporation 
 Shearline Boatworks
 Shoe Show
 Showmars
 Shurtape Technologies
 Smithfield's Chicken 'N Bar-B-Q
 Snyder's-Lance
 Social Blade
 Sonic Automotive
 Southern Bank
 Southern Express
 Speed (TV network)
 Speedball (art products)
 Speedway Motorsports
 Spire Sports + Entertainment
 SplendidCRM
 SPX Corporation
 Spoonflower
 SS-Green Light Racing
 Stewart-Haas Racing
 Syneos Health
 Tanger Factory Outlet Centers
 Team Penske
 Tengion
 Thomas Built Buses 
 Thorlo Inc.
 TigerSwan
 Tommy Baldwin Racing
 Triad Racing Technologies
 Truist Financial
 TW Garner Food Company 
 US Legend Cars
 Valencell
 Virtual Heroes
 Vontier
 Wells Fargo (Wells Fargo Securities)
 Wheatstone Corporation
 Wolfspeed
 Wood Brothers Racing
 WORX (North American headquarters)
 Wyndham Capital Mortgage
 Yep Roc Records
 Zaloni

North Dakota

Ohio

 Abercrombie & Fitch
 ABX Air
 Acme Fresh Market
 Aeronca Aircraft
 AirNet Express
 Airstream
 AK Steel Holding
 Aleris International, Inc.
 Alien Workshop
 American Electric Power
 American Financial Group
 American Greetings
 AmTrust Bank
 Applied Industrial Technologies
 Argus
 Armored Trunk Manufacturing Company
 Babcock & Wilcox
 Bath & Body Works
 Battelle Memorial Institute
 Big Lots
 bigg's
 Bob Evans Restaurants
 Cardinal Health
 CareSource
 Castle Aviation
 Charley's Grilled Subs
 Charter One Bank
 Cedar Fair
 Chiquita Brands International
 Cincinnati Financial
 Cintas
 Cleveland-Cliffs
 Codeworks
 Commerce National Bank
 Convergys
 Cooper Tire & Rubber Company
 Crown Equipment Corporation
 Dana Holding Corporation
 Diebold
 Donatos Pizza
 Dorothy Lane Market
 DPL Inc.
 E.W. Scripps Company
 Eaton Corporation
 Elder-Beerman
 Electronix corporation
 ERC
 Esther Price Candies
 Euclid-Hitachi Heavy Equipment Ltd.
 Evenflo Company
 Federated Department Stores
 Ferro Corporation
 Fifth Third Bank
 FirstEnergy
 Forest City Enterprises
 GE-Aviation
 Gojo Industries
 Gold Star Chili
 Goodyear
 Grand Aire Express
 Grismer
 Heinen's Fine Foods
 Hexion Specialty Chemicals, Inc.
 Hi-Point Firearms/Beemiller
 Hitachi Medical Systems America Inc.
 Hobart Corporation
 Hollister Co.
 Holtkamp Organ Company
 Huffy
 Human Race Theatre Company
 Huntington Bancshares Inc.
 Industramark
 Invacare
 Jo Ann Stores
 Kettering Health Network
 Key Bank
 Kroger
 Lane Bryant Inc.
 LexisNexis
 LensCrafters
 Limited Brands
 Lincoln Electric
 Lubrizol
 Malley's Chocolates
 Manor Care, Inc.
 Marathon Petroleum Company
 Marc's
 Matco Tools
 Mayfran International
 Max & Erma's
 Medical Mutual of Ohio
 Mike-sell's
 Motoman
 Moen
 NACCO Industries
 National City Corporation
 Nationwide Insurance
 NCR Corporation
 Nestlé USA - Prepared Foods Division
 NewPage Corporation
 Owens Corning
 Owens-Illinois
 Park National Bank (FBOP)
 Park National Bank (Ohio)
 Parker Hannifin
 Pearle Opticians
 PolyOne Corporation
 Premier Health Partners
 Procter & Gamble
 Progressive Corporation
 PSA Airlines
 Rax Restaurants
 The Reynolds and Reynolds Company
 Retail Ventures, operates DSW, Inc. and Value City
 RIDGID Tool Company
 Caliber System
 RPM International
 Scailex Corporation
 Scotts Miracle-Gro Company
 Sherwin-Williams Company
 Skyline Chili
 Skybus Airlines
 The J.M. Smucker Co.
 Speedway SuperAmerica
 Steak Escape
 Sunglass Hut International
 Sunny Delight Beverages
 Teradata
 Thor Industries
 Timken Company
 Trans States Airlines, operates as AmericanConnection
 TransDigm Group
 TravelCenters of America
 Tween Brands
 United States Playing Card Company
 Vertiv
 Victoria's Secret
 Wendy's
 Western & Southern Financial Group
 Westfield Insurance
 White Castle
 Worthington Industries
 YRC Regional Transportation

Oklahoma

 Beaujon Aircraft (Ardmore)
 Big Daddy's BBQ Sauce (Yukon)
 Groendyke Transport (Enid)
 Hitachi Computer Products (America) Inc. (Norman)
 Homeland Supermarkets (Edmond)
 LegalShield (Ada)
 Reasor's (Tahlequah)
 Zivko Aeronautics (Guthrie)

Oregon

Pennsylvania

 Airgas (Allentown)
 Allen Organ Company (Macungie)
 Armstrong World Industries (Lancaster)
 Associated Wholesalers (Robesonia)
 Blair Corporation (Warren)
 The Bon-Ton Stores (York)
 Boscov's (Reading)
 Bruster's Ice Cream (Bridgewater)
 Burpee Seeds (Warminster)
 Cephalon (Frazer)
 Charming Shoppes (Bensalem)
 Conestoga Wood Specialties (East Earl)
 Crayola LLC (Easton), also makers of Silly Putty
 David's Bridal (Conshohocken)
 Dentsply International (York)
 Dick's Sporting Goods (Coraopolis)
 Eat'n Park (Homestead)
 Equitable Resources
 Erie Insurance Group
 FMC Corp.
 Frankford Candy & Chocolate Company
 GE Transportation Systems
 General Nutrition Centers
 Genesis HealthCare
 Giant Food of Carlisle, Pennsylvania
 Gilson Snow
 Harsco Corporation
 Hatfield Quality Meats
 H. J. Heinz Company
 Hershey Foods Corporation
 Ikon Office Solutions
 JLG Industries
 Jones Apparel Group
 Just Born
 Kenexa Corporation
 Kennametal
 Knoll
 Lincoln National Corporation
 Loud Brothers
 MAACO
 Mack Trucks
 Majestic Athletic
 Meadows Frozen Custard
 Mellon Financial
 Natrona Bottling Company
 NCO Group
 New Era Tickets
 New Penn (trucking)
 Penn National Gaming
 Pep Boys Manny Moe & Jack (auto)
 PNC Financial Services
 PPG Industries
 PPL
 QVC
 Respironics, Inc.
 Rite Aid Corporation
 Rodale, Inc.
 Rohm and Haas 
 Select Medical Corporation
 Sovereign Bank
 Spring Garden National Bank, dissolved 1891
 STV Group
 SunGard
 Sunoco
 Teleflex, Inc.
 TransDigm Group
 Triumph Group
 Toll Brothers
 UGI Corporation, holding company of AmeriGas Partners, L.P.
 Unisys
 USX
 Universal Health Services
 Urban Outfitters
 USA 3000 Airlines
 U.S. Steel
 USF Glen Moore
 The Vanguard Group
 ViroPharma
 Vishay Intertechnology
 VWR International
 Weis Markets
 WESCO International
 Wilbur Chocolate Company
 Woolrich
 Zippo

Rhode Island

South Carolina

AgFirst
Denny's
Hitachi Electronic Devices (USA) Inc.
Horry Telephone Cooperative
Michelin North America
Park Seed Company
Prym Consumer USA, Inc.
Sonoco Products
Struthers-Dunn

South Dakota
 Black Hills Ammunition
 Black Hills Corporation
 Dakota, Minnesota and Eastern Railroad
 Daktronics
 Home Federal Bank
 Rainbow Play Systems

Tennessee

 AC Entertainment (Knoxville)
 Access America Transport (Chattanooga)
 American Residential Services (Memphis), also known as ARS/Rescue Rooter
 AutoZone (Memphis)
 Averitt Express (Cookeville)
 Boss Hoss Cycles (Dyersburg)
 Bush Brothers and Company (Knoxville)
 Chattem (Chattanooga)
 Community Health Systems (Franklin)
 Covenant Transport (Chattanooga)
 Cracker Barrel (Lebanon)
 CraftWorks Restaurants & Breweries (Chattanooga)
 CTSI-Global (Memphis)
 Dollar General (Goodlettsville)
 Double Cola (Chattanooga)
 Eastman Chemical Company (Kingsport)
 EdFinancial Services (Knoxville)
 Elvis Presley Enterprises (Memphis)
 FedEx (Memphis)
 First Horizon National Corporation (Memphis)
 First Tennessee (Memphis)
 Fred's (Memphis)
 IdleAir (Knoxville)
 International Paper (Memphis)
 Jack Daniel's Distillery (Lynchburg)
 Jiffy Steamer (Union City)
 King Pharmaceuticals (Bristol)
 Lenny's Sub Shop (Memphis)
 Lodge (South Pittsburg)
 Malco Theatres (Memphis)
 Malibu Boats (Loudon)
 MasterCraft (Vonore)
 McKee Foods (Collegedale)
 Memphis Furniture (Memphis)
 Memphis Light, Gas and Water (Memphis)
 The Metadata Company (Brentwood)
 National Narrowcasting Network (Memphis)
 Nissan North America Inc. (Smyrna)
 Olan Mills (Chattanooga)
 Old Time Pottery (Murfreesboro)
 Pal's (Kingsport)
 Perkins Restaurant and Bakery (Memphis)
 Petro's Chili & Chips (Knoxville)
 Pilot Flying J (Knoxville)
 PooPrints (Knoxville)
 Regal Entertainment Group (Knoxville)
 Ruby Tuesday (Maryville)
 ServiceMaster (Memphis)
 Servpro (Gallatin)
 Singer Corporation (La Vergne)
 STR, Inc (Hendersonville)
 Tennessee Valley Authority (Knoxville)
 Thermocopy (Knoxville)
 Tractor Supply Company (Brentwood)
 Unum (Chattanooga)
 Varsity Brands (Memphis)
 Weigel's (Powell)

Texas

Utah

Vermont
 AirNow
 Ben & Jerry's
 Bruegger's
 Burton Snowboards
 Crane & Co.
 Orvis
 Tuttle Publishing

Virginia

 Albemarle Corporation
 American Woodmark
 AMERIGROUP Corporation
 AOL
 The Brink's Company
 Bowlero Corporation
 CACI
 Capital One
 CarMax
 Circuit City
 Colgan Air
 Compass Airlines
 Dollar Tree
 Dominion Resources
 DynCorp International
 Estes Express Lines
 Farm Fresh Food & Pharmacy, a division of SuperValu
 Federal Home Loan Mortgage Corporation (Freddie Mac)
 Ferguson Enterprises
 Five Guys
 GE Fanuc Automation
 Gannett
 General Dynamics
 Genworth Financial
 IPIX
 Interstate Van Lines
 KVAT Food City
 L-3 Flight International Aviation
 Lafarge North America
 LandAmerica Financial Group
 Landmark Communications
 Liberty Tax Service
 Markel
 Mars Incorporated
 Massey Energy
 MAXjet Airways
 MeadWestvaco
 Medeco
 NACHA-The Electronic Payments Association
 NII Holdings (NEXTEL Communications)
 Norfolk Southern
 NVR
 Owens & Minor
 Primus Telecom
 Reynolds Metals
 Rolls-Royce North America
 SCG International Risk
 SLM Corporation (Sallie Mae)
 Smithfield Foods
 Southern Exposure Seed Exchange
 Sprint Nextel Corporation - executive headquarters
 Touchstone Energy
 Trailways Transportation System
 Ukrop's Super Market
 Universal Corporation
 Velocity Micro

Washington

West Virginia
Gabriel Brothers
Marquee Cinemas
Tudor's Biscuit World
Wheeling-Pittsburgh Steel

Wisconsin

 Air Wisconsin
 Alliant Energy
 American Family Insurance
 Amsoil
 Ashley Furniture
 Associated Banc-Corp
 Bemis Company
 Ben Franklin Stores
 Cousins Subs
 Culver's
 Epic Systems
 Fiserv
 Freight Runners Express
 Good Humor-Breyers
 Harley-Davidson
 Jockey International
 Johnson Controls
 S. C. Johnson & Son
 Johnsonville Foods
 Journal Communications
 Kohler Company
 Kohl's
 Kopp's Frozen Custard
 Kwik Trip
 Lake Express
 Lands' End
 Manpower Inc.
 Marcus Corporation
 Marshall & Ilsley Corporation (M&I Bank)
 Master Lock
 Menards
 Midwest Airlines
 Milio's Sandwiches
 Milwaukee Electric Tool Company
 Omanhene Cocoa Bean Company
 Oshkosh Truck
 Pacific Cycle, owns Mongoose and Roadmaster brands
 Rockwell Automation
 Roundy's
 Sentry Foods
 Sentry Insurance
 Schneider National
 Schreiber Foods
 Sprecher Brewery, Root beer, Beer, hard sodas, cider, seltzers
 Skyway Airlines, operating as Midwest Connect for Midwest Airlines
 Snap-on
 Spot Filmworks, film production, Madison
 Trane
 Thrivent Financial for Lutherans
 Trek Bicycle Corporation
 Western States Envelope & Label
 Wisconsin Energy Corporation
 Woodman's Food Market

Wyoming

See also